John Broward Culpepper (December 9, 1907 – April 7, 1990) was an important influence on university education in Florida.  He was designated a Great Floridan in 2000.

Education
Culpepper was born in Perry, Florida. His undergraduate work was completed at the University of Florida in 1929 where he was a member of Theta Chi fraternity. He received a Master of Arts from the Ohio State University. then an educational doctorate from Columbia University. He married the former Betty Dunn and they had two sons, John Blair and Philip Bruce.

Career
Culpepper was Principal at P.K. Yonge Developmental Research School in Gainesville, Florida from 1935-1938; Principal at Leesburg, Florida's High School from 1940-1941; Principal at Leon High School in Tallahassee, Florida from 1941-1944. He was Dean of Men at Florida State University from 1947-1954. In 1954, he became the first Chancellor of State University System of Florida, serving until 1968. The University of West Florida, University of South Florida and Florida Atlantic University were created by Culpepper before he took a position at Texas Woman’s University to be closer to family. He was designated a Great Floridian by the Florida Department of State in the Great Floridians 2000 Program. A plaque attesting to the honor is located at Leon High School in Tallahassee, Florida.

References

1907 births
1990 deaths
People from Perry, Florida
University of Florida alumni
Ohio State University alumni
Teachers College, Columbia University alumni
Chancellors of the State University System of Florida
20th-century American academics